Originally released in 1987, Live at the Seaside is the first concert video release by Erasure, recorded at the Brighton Dome  on 17 April 1987 by the BBC as part of the duo's tour of their second studio album The Circus. The video, originally only available on VHS, features 13 tracks from the concert and, amongst tracks from The Circus, includes performances of songs from Erasure's first album Wonderland plus "Gimme! Gimme! Gimme!", the band's first foray into ABBA cover versions.

The opening song "Safety in Numbers" is uniquely credited to this tour, though, in fact, appears uncredited on "The Circus album" and "The Two Ring Circus" as the latter part of "Spiralling". All subsequent performances and recordings of "Spiralling" omit the "Safety In Numbers" part.

The songs "Victim of Love", "It Doesn't Have to Be", "Who Needs Love Like That", "Oh L'amour" and "Sometimes" are inter-cut with footage from their respective music videos.

European tour and on-the-road footage shot on Video 8 from 1985 to 1986 by Steev Toth is also inter-cut into the songs "Leave Me to Bleed", "If I Could", "Spiralling" and "Oh L'amour".

Track listing

 VHS Video: VVD209

 "Safety in Numbers"
 "Victim of Love"
 "It Doesn't Have to Be"
 "Don't Dance"
 "Who Needs Love (Like That)"
 "Leave Me to Bleed"
 "If I Could"
 "Oh L'amour"
 "The Circus"
 "Say What"
 "Sometimes"
 "Spiralling"
 "Gimme! Gimme! Gimme!"

Video and DVD re-releases

The video was later re-released on the budget 4 Front Video label. The track listing remained the same, but the cover artwork was slightly modified to suit the generic 'gold border' packaging of the 4 Front Video budget range.

In 2011, the concert was again re-released, this time on DVD, as part of the 2011 expanded and remastered The Circus. No significant changes or additions were made.

Video credits

 Band members: Vince Clarke, Andy Bell
 Backing vocals: Derek Smith, Stephen Myers

BBC concert footage

 Producer/director: Peter Hamilton
 Assistant producer: Neil Ferris
 Production assistant: Karen Treloar
 Production co-ordinator: Verity White
 Live sound: Andrew Whittle, Colin Callan
 Sound produced by: Peter Dauncey, Daniel Miller
 Sound engineer: Paul Nickson
 Sound assistants: Chris Gibbs, Paul Brogdan
 Lights: Christopher Ward, Richard Hinds, Neil Kirby
 Tour manager: Andrew Mansi
 Transport: Johnney Marr
 Thanks to: BBC No Limits, BBC Transcriptions Unit, Brighton Dome, Tim Parsons, Dan Silver

European tour footage 1985–86

 Video 8 material : Steev Toth
 Backing vocals – James Burkmar, Christopher Dee
 Tour manager: Andrew Mansi
 Moral support: Anne Swindell, Paul Hickey
 Special appearance: Grizzley

Live at the Seaside

 Produced by Medialab Ltd.
 Editing facilities: Carlton Television
 Sound remixed: Paul Kendal at Blackwing Studios
 Director/editor: Jerry Chater
 Executive producers: Angus Margerison, Daniel Miller

Related releases

 The audio recording of the tracks "Don't Dance" and "Leave Me to Bleed" also appear on the CD single of "Victim of Love".
 On the same tour, Erasure's performances at Knopf Halle, Hamburg on 27 and 28 April 1987 were also recorded. Many of these tracks are distributed across "The Circus single releases", on editions of The Two Ring Circus remix album and in the Erasure singles box set EBX 2.

References

External links 
 Live At The Seaside on the official Erasure website
 The Circus remastered on the official Erasure website
 Live At The Seaside at the Internet Movie Database
 Original VHS release on Discogs.com
 4 Front VHS Re-release on Discogs.com

Erasure live albums
1987 live albums
Mute Records live albums
1987 video albums
Live video albums
Mute Records video albums
Electropop video albums
Live electropop albums